The 156th Infantry Regiment ("First Louisiana") is an infantry regiment in the United States Army and the Louisiana National Guard.

History
The 2nd Battalion, 156th Infantry Regiment was originally organized between 9 and 17 May 1861 as the 2nd and 3rd Louisiana Volunteer Infantry Regiments and mustered into Confederate service at New Orleans. The 2nd Louisiana Volunteer Infantry Regiment surrendered on 9 April 1865 at Appomattox, VA, with the Army of Northern Virginia; the 3d Louisiana Volunteer Infantry Regiment disbanded on 20 May 1865 at Shreveport, LA.

The 2nd and 3rd Louisiana Volunteer Infantry Regiments reconstituted on 30 March 1878 as the Special Militia Force to include separate companies and battalions outside Orleans Parish; its elements organized between 1878 and 1890 embracing fifteen companies by 1890. They were reorganized in part on 26 December 1891 as the 1st and 2nd Battalions of Infantry and transferred to the Louisiana State National Guard. The battalions consolidated on 17 March 1896 to form the 1st Regiment of Infantry with headquarters at Baton Rouge.

The unit was mustered into federal service between 8–18 May 1898 at New Orleans as the 1st Louisiana Volunteer Infantry and mustered out of federal service on 3 October 1898 at Jacksonville, FL. It was reorganized on 8 August 1899 in the Louisiana State National Guard as the 1st Battalion of Infantry with headquarters at Monroe. It was expanded, reorganized, and redesignated on 6 December 1904 as the 1st Regiment of Infantry with headquarters at Monroe. The Louisiana State National Guard was meanwhile redesignated in 1910 as the Louisiana National Guard.

World War I

The 1st Louisiana Infantry was drafted into federal service on 5 August 1917 and assigned to the 39th Division. The Headquarters Company, Supply Company, Machine Gun Company, and Companies A, B, C, D, E and F were used to form the 156th Infantry Regiment. Two-thirds of the enlisted men from Companies G, I, and M were assigned as part of the 154th Infantry Regiment, while one-third were assigned to the 114th Engineer Regiment. Companies H and L were assigned as part of the 114th Machine Gun Battalion. Half of the enlisted men from Company K were assigned to the 114th Field Signal Battalion, while the other half were assigned to the 114th Train Headquarters and Military Police. The 39th Division was redesignated the 5th Depot Division on 14 August 1918.

World War II
The 156th Infantry was ordered into federal service on 25 November 1940 at home stations. It moved to Camp Bowie, Texas, on 26 February 1942 where it was relieved on 14 July 1942 from assignment to the 31st Division. The 156th arrived in England on 6 October 1942 and the 2nd Battalion, because of the French language abilities of many of its members, was sent to Algeria for military police duties and was redesignated the 202nd Infantry Battalion on 1 September 1943, inactivating on 25 February 1944. The personnel of the 202nd Infantry Battalion were then assigned to the 66th through 74th Military Police Companies (constituted 12 February 1944 in the Army of the United States and activated on 25 February 1944). The regiment was assigned to the U.S. Army Assault Training Center at Woolacombe, England, and a new 2nd Battalion was activated by shipping the 3rd Battalion, 131st Infantry Regiment to England from Fort Brady, Michigan. The 156th went ashore in France in June 1944 and acted as a separate infantry regiment, performing guard duties at headquarters, POW camps (like CCPWE26 in Belgium) or supply installations, and containing German troops bypassed by allied forces in France. The regiment returned to the United States and was inactivated on 13 March 1946 at Camp Kilmer, New Jersey. Assigned on 28 May 1946 to the 39th Infantry Division, it was reorganized and federally recognized on 18 December 1946 with headquarters at Lafayette.

Post-World War II
The 156th Infantry and 199th Infantry (less 3d Battalion) consolidated on 1 July 1959 and reorganized as the 156th Infantry, a parent regiment under the Combat Arms Regimental System, to consist of the 1st, 2nd, and 3rd Battle Groups, elements of the 39th Infantry Division (3d Battalion, 199th Infantry, concurrently converted and redesignated as the 539th Transportation Battalion – hereafter separate lineage).

The 156th Infantry reorganized on 1 May 1963 to consist of the 1st, 2nd, 3rd, and 4th Battalions, elements of the 39th Infantry Division/ It reorganized on 1 December 1967 to consist of the 1st, 2nd, and 3rd Battalions, elements of the 256th Infantry Brigade; on 1 March 1977 to consist of the 2nd and 3rd Battalions, elements of the 256th Infantry Brigade; on 1 July 1991 to consist of the 2nd and 3rd Battalions, elements of the 256th Infantry Brigade, and the 4th Battalion; and on 1 February 1993 to consist of the 2nd and 3rd Battalions, elements of the 256th Infantry Brigade. As part of the 256th IBCT the unit deployed twice to Iraq, in 2004-5 and again in 2010.

Organization

1st Battalion
Disbanded and removed from service following re-organization of the regiment on 1 March 1977.

2nd Battalion
The 2nd Battalion, 156th Infantry is headquartered in Abbeville, Louisiana in Vermilion Parish. It consists of the following:

Headquarters and Headquarters Company (HHC) located in Abbeville, LA with a detachment in Jeanerette, LA.

Alpha Company (Rifle) located in Breaux Bridge, LA with a detachment in Plaquemine, LA.

Bravo Company (Rifle) located in New Iberia, LA with a detachment in Franklin, LA.

Charlie Company (Rifle) located in Houma, LA.

Delta Company (Weapons) located in Thibodaux, LA.

Golf Company (FSC attached from 199th BSB) located in Jeanerette, LA with a detachment in Abbeville, LA

3rd Battalion
The 3rd Battalion, 156th Infantry is headquartered in Lake Charles, Louisiana. It consists of the following:

Headquarters and Headquarters Company (HHC) located in Lake Charles, LA with a detachment in DeQuincy, LA

Alpha Company (Rifle) located in Fort Polk, LA with a detachment in DeRidder, LA

Bravo Company (Rifle) located in Pineville, LA (Camp Beauregard) with a detachment in Baton Rouge, LA

Charlie Company (Rifle) located in Crowley, LA with a detachment in New Orleans, LA

Delta Company (Weapons) located in Opelousas, LA

Hotel Company (FSC attached from 199th BSB) located in DeQuincy, LA

4th Battalion
Disbanded and removed from service following re-organization of the regiment on 1 December 1967.

Distinctive unit insignia
Description
A Silver color metal and enamel device 1 1/8 inches (2.86 cm) in height overall consisting of a shield blazoned: Per fess enhanced Azure and Argent in chief a saltire couped of the second and in base a leopard passant guardant of the first armed and langued Gules. Attached below and to the sides of the shield a Blue scroll inscribed "DIEU ET MOI" in Silver letters.
Symbolism
The shield is in the colors of the Infantry. The organization's honorable Civil War service is shown by the saltire, (St. Andrews cross), taken from the Confederate battle flag. The leopard is taken from the arms of Normandy and symbolized the campaigns fought in Northern France. The motto translates to "God and I."
Background
The distinctive unit insignia was approved on 12 October 1951.

Coat of arms
Blazon
 Shield- Per fess enhanced Azure and Argent in chief a saltire couped of the second and in base a leopard passant guardant of the first armed and langued Gules.
Crest- That for the regiments and separate battalions of the Louisiana Army National Guard: On a wreath of the colors Argent and Azure, a pelican in her piety affronté with three young in nest, Argent, armed and vulned Proper. Motto: DIEU ET MOI (God and I).
 Symbolism
Shield- The shield is in the colors of the Infantry. The organization's honorable Civil War service is shown by the saltire, (St. Andrews cross), taken from the Confederate battle flag. The leopard is taken from the arms of Normandy and symbolized the campaigns fought in Northern France.
 Crest- The crest is that of the Louisiana Army National Guard.
 Background- The coat of arms was approved on 12 October 1951.

References

2nd Battalion, 156th Infantry Regiment (Mechanized)
3rd Battalion, 156th Infantry Regiment (Mechanized)

156
Military units and formations in Louisiana
Infantry regiments of the United States Army National Guard
United States Army regiments of World War I